Ran Wei is an American actress and fashion model of Chinese descent. She is best known for her role as Vivian Liu in Switch and as Soo Chin in How to Survive High School.

Early life 
Wei was born in Zhengzhou, China. Wei moved to the United States when she was 16 years old to live with her parents in the San Francisco Bay Area.

Career 
Wei was discovered by a talent scout while working in a clothing store and appeared in many commercials before relocating to Los Angeles to further pursue her acting career. She has continued to do work that appears both in the US and China, including commercials for Apple for the English and Mandarin market, which garnered the attention of the Chinese newspaper World Journal, the US's largest Chinese newspaper, and CCTV, China's predominant state television broadcaster. She is the cover model on the first anniversary issue of Faddy Magazine and featured inside with an exclusive interview about her life and career. The Visual Effects Society also invited Ran to present awards, including a Lifetime Achievement Award to Ridley Scott, and a Visionary Award to Syd Mead, for their 14th Annual VES Awards.

In 2020, Ran joined as C4 for the Amazon Prime Tv Show Cyborgs Universe.

Filmography

Television

Film

Awards and nominations

FilmQuest

!
|-
| 2019
|Fatale Collective: Bleed
| Best Ensemble Cast
| 
|-
|}

References

External links

American actresses of Chinese descent
American film actresses
American television actresses
Living people
Actresses from Los Angeles
21st-century American actresses
Chinese emigrants to the United States
Year of birth missing (living people)
Actresses from Zhengzhou